Otong soup is a Nigerian soup made in the South Eastern region, it is popular among the Efik tribe of the cross River state. Similar soup are 'Ila alasepo' of Yoruba and 'okwuru' of the Igbo tribe.

Three vegetables used in preparing the soup are ikong  Ubong (Ugu leaves), Uziza leaves and Okra. Assorted meats, fishes, crayfish,bonnet pepper, Onion and palm oil are used in cooking the Efik soup.

Other foods 
The soup is served with Ayan Ekpang, fufu, Eba and Pounded yam.

See also 
 Oron people
 Efik people
 Balondo Civilization

References 

Vegetable soups
Nigerian soups